The Fairchild Hiller FH-1100 is a single-engine, single two-bladed rotor, light helicopter which began as a design entry into the United States Army's Light Observation Helicopter program as the Hiller YOH-5. The Hiller Model 1100 was not selected but after Hiller Aircraft was purchased by Fairchild Stratos in 1964, the Model 1100 was successfully marketed as a civilian helicopter, the FH-1100. The type certificate is now held by the FH1100 Manufacturing Corporation of Century, Florida.

Development

Light Observation Helicopter (LOH)

In October 1960, the Army submitted a request for proposals (RFP) for the Light Observation Helicopter (LOH). Hiller Aircraft (Hiller), along with 12 other manufacturers, including Bell Helicopter (Bell) and Hughes Tool Co. Aircraft Division (Hughes), entered the competition, submitting their designs to a Navy team for evaluation. Hiller submitted the Model 1100, which was recommended by the Navy team and eventually selected as one of three winners of the design competition by the Army in May 1961. The Army designated the Model 1100 design as the YOH-5.

Detailed design work began in November 1961, and the Model 1100 prototype made its maiden flight on 21 January 1963. Hiller produced a total of five copies of the Model 1100 to submit to the Army for the Test and Evaluation phase at Camp Rucker, Alabama in 1963. After the test and evaluation, the Bell YOH-4 was eliminated, and Hiller and Hughes competed in a program cost analysis bid for the contract. In 1965, Hiller was underbid by Hughes and the Army selected Hughes' YOH-6. Although Hiller formally protested, Hughes was awarded a production contract for the OH-6 Cayuse.

In 1967, when the Army reopened the LOH competition for bids because Hughes Tool Co. Aircraft Division could not meet the contractual production demands. Fairchild-Hiller decided not to resubmit their bid with the YOH-5A, instead choosing to continue with commercial marketing of their civilian version, the FH-1100.

The FH-1100 was produced until 1973. In 2000, the Type Certificate was purchased by FH1100 Manufacturing Corporation. FH1100 Manufacturing conducts remanufacturing and training but has not received a production certificate for the FH-1100, which it now calls the FHoenix.

Variants
Hiller Model 1100
Four-seat prototype powered by an Allison 250-C10 engine and certified in May 1964.

FH-1100
Civil production five-seat model powered by an Allison 250-C18 engine and certified in November 1966. Later production fitted with an Allison 250-C20B engine. 246-built

RH-1100A Pegasus
Updated civil version, built and marketed by Rogerson Hiller Helicopters.

RH-1100M
Updated military version, built and marketed by Rogerson Hiller Helicopters.

YOH-5A
United States Army designations for five Model 1100 for evaluation powered by a 250shp Allison T-63-A-5 engine.

Former operators
  
Argentine Army Aviation - 9 received - survivors passed to Argentine National Gendarmerie
Argentine National Gendarmerie

PCERJ
Brazilian Air Force
Brazilian Navy - six operated 1968–1977

 Okanagan Helicopters 

Ecuadorian Air Force One delivered 1967

 El Salvador Air Force - Two

 Panamanian Air Force - Three operated

 Royal Thai Border Police - 16 operated.

 Baltimore City Police
 California Highway Patrol
 Nassau County Police Department

Specifications (FH-1100)

See also

References
Notes

Bibliography

External links

 FH1100 Manufacturing, current Type Certificate holder.
 RH-1100 Hornet at airwar.ru
 FAA Type Certificate

FH-1100
1960s United States helicopters
FH-1100
1960s United States military reconnaissance aircraft
Aircraft first flown in 1963
Single-turbine helicopters